Ella Milch-Sheriff (Hebrew: אלה מילך-שריף) is an Israeli composer, winner of ACUM award for lifetime achievfment (2022).
Born in Haifa, Israel,  Milch-Sheriff began her career as a composer at the age of 12. During her military service she composed, performed and interpreted her own songs after which she returned to classical music studying composition under the direction of Professor Tzvi Avni and graduating in composition from the Rubin Academy of Music at Tel Aviv University.

Milch-Sheriff has composed operas, chamber, orchestral and vocal music as well as popular music and solo works.

Selected works
 Clarinet Quartet, Clarinet, Violin, Viola and Cello, 2022, Intonations festival. Berlin, Germany. Jerusalem Chamber Music Festival.
 Abschied (Farewell Eng.), Soprano and Orchestra, 2021, Bochum Symphony Orchestra, Germany.
 "The Eternal Stranger" (Der ewige Fremde), Actor and symphony orchestra, 2020,  Beethoven's 250th anniversary, Leipzig, Palermo, London.
 "The Banality of Love" (Die Banalitaet der Liebe), Opera, 2018, Staatstheater Regensburg, Germany.
 "Baruch's Silence" (Baruchs Schweigen), A chamber opera, 2010, Staatstheater Braunschweig, Germany.
 "And the Rat Laughed", Opera, 2005, The Israel Chamber Orchestra in co-production with the Cameri Theatre, Tel Aviv, Israel
 Contrapunctus XIV, J. S. Bach, Orchestration for symphony orchestra, 2019, Bach Festival, Leipzig, Germany.
 Songs from the Edge, String Quartet No. 1 for Mezzo-Soprano and string quartet, 2006, The Chautauqua Festival, NY USA.
 "Shacharit" (Dawn), For Soprano and Baritone solo, mixed choir and chamber orchestra, 2018, The Israel Camerata Jerusalem.
 Conversation with a Stone,, Soprano, Mezzo-Soprano, Women's Choir, Oboe, Violoncello & Piano, 2015, Bonn, Luxembourg.
 Reflections on Love, For Piano solo, 2013, Commissioned and premiered at Rubinstein Competition, Tel-Aviv, Israel  
 Concerto for Piano and Orchestra, 2010, Israel Sinfonietta.
 "Dark am I", A musical fantasy based on "The Song of Solomon", for Soprano, Counter-Tenor, Tenor, Bass and chamber ensemble,2007, The Israel Festival, Jerusalem.
 "Can Heaven be Void" (Ist der Himmel leer?), for Narrator, Mezzo-Soprano & Orchestra (Versions in English, German, Italian, Polish, Lithuanian & Hebrew) 2003, Ra'anana Symphonette. Israel.

Future projects
New opera for Volkaoper Vienna
Performances in Boston, Santa Barbara, Stockholm, Parma,Spain,

Awards
2022, winner of ACUM award for lifetime achievement. (ACUM: Israeli organization of composers and authors).
In 2005, Ella Milch-Sheriff was awarded the prestigious “Israeli Prime-Minister Prize” for her compositional works and the same year, her opera, "And the Rat Laughed” conceived with Nava Semel and based on her book received the “Rosenblume Prize” for achievement.

Best music for a film for "Past Life", Montreal JFF, 2017. Festival du Cinéma Israélien de Montréal

References

External links
Official Website of Ella Milch-Sheriff
my heaven is full of music a film about the composer Ella Milch Sheriff
"Baruchs Schweigen": Wenn Wortlosigkeit zur Musikgeschichte wird - derStandard.at
Ella Milch-Sheriff: "Statt einer Psychoanalyse schrieb ich eine Oper" - derStandard.at
WIEN/ Semperdepot/ Festival „EntArteOpera“: BARUCHS SCHWEIGEN von Ella Milch-Sheriff. Österreichische Erstaufführung
Oper - Stimmen aus dem Totenreich
Die Deutsche Bühne

Israeli classical composers
Living people
Year of birth missing (living people)
People from Haifa
Women classical composers
21st-century Israeli women musicians
21st-century classical composers
Israeli opera composers
Women opera composers
Tel Aviv University alumni
21st-century women composers